Philip Hall Likes Me, I Reckon Maybe is a children's novel written by Bette Greene that was awarded a Newbery Honor in 1975. The book was published in 1974 by Puffin Books. It is the first of three novels to feature protagonist Beth Lambert and her friend Philip Hall. The sequels are titled Get On Out of Here, Philip Hall, and I've Already Forgotten Your Name, Philip Hall.

The book is set in rural Arkansas in the late 20th century. Eleven-year-old Beth Lambert is second-best at almost everything in school, from math to sports. She doesn't mind, though, because she's second only to Philip Hall. Over the course of the novel, she begins to grapple with the idea that perhaps she's letting Philip beat her so he'll remain her friend.

1974 American novels
African-American novels
American children's novels
Newbery Honor-winning works
Novels set in Arkansas
Novels set in elementary and primary schools
1974 children's books